Alucita ochrozona is a moth of the family Alucitidae. It is found in Bhutan.

References

Moths described in 1910
Alucitidae
Moths of Asia
Taxa named by Edward Meyrick